Aromobates, sometimes known as the skunk frogs, is a genus of frogs from the Andes of Venezuela and Colombia. Originally a monotypic genus consisting of the skunk frog, Aromobates nocturnus alone, it was later expanded to include Nephelobates. These frogs are difficult to differentiate from Allobates without using molecular markers.

Etymology
The generic name derives from the Latin aroma, meaning "sweet odor". The odor of the type species, Aromobates nocturnus, is reminiscent of a skunk.

Description
Aromobates are small to medium-sized frogs that have cryptic colouration. They have robust body form and basal to extensive toe webbing.

Species
There are 18 species, many of them endangered:
 Aromobates alboguttatus (Boulenger, 1903) (Possibly Extinct)
 Aromobates cannatellai Barrio-Amorós and Santos, 2012
 Aromobates capurinensis (Péfaur, 1993)
 Aromobates duranti (Péfaur, 1985) (Critically Endangered)
 Aromobates ericksonae Barrio-Amorós and Santos, 2012
 Aromobates haydeeae (Rivero, 1978) (Possibly Extinct)
 Aromobates leopardalis (Rivero, 1978)  (Possibly Extinct)
 Aromobates mayorgai (Rivero, 1980) (Endangered)
 Aromobates meridensis (Dole and Durant, 1972) (Critically Endangered)
 Aromobates molinarii (La Marca, 1985) (Critically Endangered)
 Aromobates nocturnus Myers, Paolillo-O., and Daly, 1991  (Critically Endangered)
 Aromobates ornatissimus Barrio-Amorós, Rivero, and Santos, 2011
 Aromobates orostoma (Rivero, 1978) (Critically Endangered)
 Aromobates saltuensis (Rivero, 1980)  (Endangered)
 Aromobates serranus (Péfaur, 1985) (Possibly Extinct)
 Aromobates tokuko Rojas-Runjaic, Infante-Rivero, and Barrio-Amorós, 2011 
 Aromobates walterarpi La Marca and Otero-López, 2012 
 Aromobates zippeli Barrio-Amorós and Santos, 2012

References

 
Aromobatidae
Amphibians of South America
Amphibian genera